Andromachus of Cyprus was an allied admiral of Alexander the Great during the Siege of Tyre in 332 BC. He may have been the same Andromachus who was shortly afterward appointed the governor of Coele-Syria, and was burnt to death by the Samaritans.

References

Admirals of Alexander the Great
Ancient Cypriots
4th-century BC Greek people